The tenth season of Big Brother Suomi premiered on 24 August 2014 and was screened on Sub. Mari Sainio continued as the main host for the program, known as Big Brother Talk Show, while Sauli Koskinen hosted the companion show Big Brother Extra. The previous season saw celebrities as contestants while this edition reverted to casting civilians as contestants. The contestants, also known as Housemates, lived inside the Big Brother House with the goal to be the last housemate and win €100,000. The program concluded on 14 November 2014 where Andte Gaup-Juuso was crowned the winner with 65.39% of the public vote to win. Big Brother Suomi went on a five-year hiatus after the conclusion of this season before being revived for an eleventh season that premiered on 1 September 2019 on Jim and Nelonen.

Housemates

Groups 
This year housemates were divided into two groups when they entered the house. There is a fence separating Basement and Mansion groups, and weekly tasks are competition against basement and mansion.

The Stone Quarry was a penalty area. The Stone quarry group was totally separated from other housemates, and they lived in the open air.

The group Operation Autumn Storm is a group of volunteered housemates. They can earn two weeks of immunity against evictions, but they have hardened rules.  1st rule violation means a warning, 2nd violation brings him/her up for eviction and 3rd rule violation means instant ejection.

 On the launch night, housemates were divided into two houses: the Basement and the Mansion.
 On Day 2, two housemates, Jarno and Jussi, switched houses.
 On Day 8, Joonas needed to decide one switch from Mansion to Basement. He chooses Joni (was not able to choose himself).
 On Day 14, Basement won the weekly task, and they wanted to change sides.
 On Day 18, Jonathan got a "penalty" and switched houses.
 On Day 22, Basement won weekly task again, and they wanted to change sides.
 On Day 23, two housemates, Nimo and Janne, switched houses.
 On Day 29, Basement won and all changed sides.
 On Day 33, Janne and Dani changed sides
 On Day 36, Basement won and all changed sides.
 On Day 38, the Penalty area "stone quarry" was introduced.  Jenna, Nimo and Jarno to quarry.
 On Day 39, Dani must order someone to quarry, he chose Andte.
 On Day 40, Big Brother rearranged teams.
 On Day 43, Jenna got removed from Quarry and moved back to the house. Quickly after this, there was an announcement that the basement won the weekly task, so they wanted to change sides.
 On Day 44, Andte and Jarno returned from the quarry.
 On Day 46, two new housemates, Pertti and Jussi K.
 On Day 58, Basement and Mansion separation ended.
 On Day 59, Jonathan, Pertti, Andte and Tuulikki started Operation Autumn Storm.
 On Day 60, Tuulikki got removed from Autumn Storm for health reasons and got back to the House.
 On Day 64, Operation Autumn Storm ended.

Nominations table 
The first housemate in each box was nominated for two points, and the second housemate was nominated for one point.

Notes 
 : This week's nominations were fake. Unknown to the housemates, all of them were up for eviction.
 : Janne and Leyla were exempt to nominate and immune as new housemates.
 : People in the Quarry can't nominate.
 : Nimo is up for eviction as a penalty.
 : New housemates give 3+2 nomination points instead of 2+1.
 : No nominations, Weekly task decides who are up for eviction.
 : People in Operation Autumn storm have immunity for two weeks.
 : Dani is up for eviction as a penalty and he cannot get nomination points.
 : Similar to Big Brother Danmark, one housemate was the killer and had to choose 2 victims. If these 2 victims guess correctly who "killed" them, the killer will be nominated. If they guess wrong, they will be nominated with the person who they guessed was the killer and Dani (who was automatically nominated). Joni and Jussi K were the victims, and they guessed Joonas was the killer. As they guessed wrong (Jenna was the real killer), Joni, Jussi K and Joonas were nominated along with Dani. This concept continued on week 10 with two new murderers and new victims.
 : Fake nominations. All housemates are up for eviction.
 : This week voting is for the winner.  Everyone is up for voting.

Nominations Totals Received 

 Week 2 nominations were fake.
 Week 11 nominations were fake.

References

External links 
 Official Website 

2014 Finnish television seasons
10